Mildred "Millie" Sampson (born 13 February 1933) is a former New Zealand long-distance runner who is recognized by the International Association of Athletics Federations as having set a world best in the marathon on 21 July 1964, with a time of 3:19:33 in Auckland, New Zealand. Sampson was reportedly encouraged to enter the marathon at the Owairaka Athletic Club by the men she trained with, including Olympians Bill Baillie and Ivan Keats. According to Sampson, Keats believed her participation would attract attention to the marathon and his running club which was organizing the event. Sampson, reported as having been fatigued due to dancing the previous night and having had no breakfast the morning of the race, ate ice cream and chocolate during the last few miles of the race. Reports after the race described her as a mother, which was untrue.

Biography
In the only other marathon that Sampson ever ran, her 3:13:58 in Auckland on 9 May 1970 was good enough for the sixth best woman's time in the world that year. She is a three-time national champion in cross country (1966, 1968, 1972) and won unofficial national titles in the event from 1963 to 1965.

As of 2008, Sampson worked at a drycleaners.

Notes

References

1933 births
World record setters in athletics (track and field)
New Zealand female marathon runners
Living people
New Zealand female long-distance runners